Cabela's Big Game Hunter III is the second sequel to the original Cabela's Big Game Hunter. It was released in 1999 by HeadGames Publishing, Inc.

Expansion pack
Cabela's Big Game Hunter III: The Next Harvest is an expansion pack for the original game, published in 1999 by Activision. It includes a range of new hunt sequence videos, authentic Cabela's hunting gear, weapons and huntable species.

References

External links

1999 video games
Hunting video games
Video games developed in the United States
Windows games
Windows-only games
Cabela's video games